Hindmarsh is a surname.

Hindmarsh may also refer to:

Places

Antarctica
 , an ice plateau on the Fletcher Ice Rise in Antarctica

Australia
The following places are either named after or derived from John Hindmarsh, the first Governor of South Australia.

South Australia
 County of Hindmarsh, a cadastral unit
 Division of Hindmarsh, an electoral division for the Australian House of Representatives
 Hindmarsh, South Australia, a suburb of Adelaide
 Hindmarsh Stadium, a soccer stadium located in the suburb  
 Town of Hindmarsh, a later corporate body based on the suburb
 Hindmarsh Island, an island near the mouth of the Murray River
 Hindmarsh River, a river  
 Hindmarsh Square, Adelaide, a square in the city of Adelaide
 Hindmarsh Valley, a valley
 Hundred of Hindmarsh, a cadastral unit

Victoria
 Lake Hindmarsh, a lake
 Shire of Hindmarsh, a local government area

See also
 Hindmarsh Valley (disambiguation)
 West Hindmarsh, South Australia